Kani Township  is a township in Yinmabin District, Sagaing Region, Myanmar. The principal town is Kani.

Natural spirulina is available from Twinma and Taung Pauk but their combined yield was a lot less than the yield of Twintaung of Budalin Township.

2021 unrest 

In December 2021, BBC News reported the Myanmar military carried out four mass killings in July 2021 as part of the unrest following the country's 2021 coup d'etat. The BBC's investigation, which characterized Kani Township as "an opposition stronghold", interviewed 11 alleged witnesses to the killings, and compared them to cell phone videos and photographs collected by Myanmar Witness, a UK-based NGO. The investigation concluded that over 40 people in Kani Township were killed by the military, including at least 14 in one killing in the village of Yin.

References

External links
Maplandia World Gazetteer - map showing the township boundary

Townships of Sagaing Region